Etron, e-tron, or variation, may refer to:

 étron, see List of French words of Germanic origin (C-G)
 Audi e-tron (brand), "e-tron", a sub-brand of Audi automobiles for all-electric cars
 Audi e-tron (concept car), a series of electric concept cars from Audi
 Audi e-tron (2018), a battery-electric SUV introduced by Audi in 2018
 eTron 3T, a disposable e-cigarette

See also

 Etron Fou Leloublan, a French rock band
 Remington EtronX, an electronic primer ignition system for the Remington Model 700
 "Les hologénies de l’Etron", an exhibition of works by Saülo Mercader
 prince Croqu'étron, a fictional character created by Marguerite de Lubert
 
 
 Tron (disambiguation)
 E (disambiguation)